Somewhere in Trinsic is a 7-inch EP by Ohio-based pop punk band Mixtapes in 2012.

Track listing

Personnel
Ryan Rockwell – vocals, guitar
Maura Weaver – vocals, guitar
Michael Remley – bass
Boone Haley – drums

References

2012 EPs